Ogryzkovo is the name of several rural localities in Russia:
Ogryzkovo, Kungursky District, Perm Krai, a village in Kungursky District of Perm Krai
Ogryzkovo, Permsky District, Perm Krai, a village in Permsky District of Perm Krai
Ogryzkovo, Tver Oblast, a village in Seletskoye Rural Settlement of Maksatikhinsky District in Tver Oblast
Ogryzkovo, Vologda Oblast, a village in Nizhneyentalsky Selsoviet of Kichmengsko-Gorodetsky District in Vologda Oblast